Bačko Petrovo Selo (Hungarian: Péterréve, German: Batschko Petrovo Selo) is a village located in the Bečej Municipality, in the South Bačka District of Serbia. It is situated in the Autonomous Province of Vojvodina. The village has a Hungarian ethnic majority and its population numbering 7,318 people (2002 census).

Features
The village is located on the right bank of the river Tisa. There are two monuments in the village in memory of the people who lost their lives in the Second World War. After World War II, Bačko Petrovo Selo developed into an economic hub, due to its thriving agricultural industry, however, it experiences an economic downturn nowadays. In the transition era that followed the fall of communism, and the Yugoslav Wars a large percentage of the population lost their jobs and many left the village in search for better opportunities elsewhere.

Demographics

Historical population
1961: 10,410
1971: 9,645
1981: 8,959
1991: 7,958
2002: 7,318

Ethnic groups
Population of the village include (as of 2002 census):
 5,175 (70.72%) Hungarians
 1,567 (21.41%) Serbs
 243 (3.32%) Romani
 others.

Culture

A Serbian Orthodox monastery is Bačko Petrovo Selo's most famous landmark. It features a fountain whose holy water, according to local lore, has healing properties. It attracts many visitors at the celebration day of the monastery every year to take holy water from the fountain.

Economy

Bačko Petrovo Selo has a very developed economy and agriculture. It possess very rich and flat land with highly fertile soil. The village has two economical factories that are indebted to produce fruits and vegetables, which are later delivered to Bečej, to the vegetable factory "Flora".

Education
There is an elementary school in Bačko Petrovo Selo, "Šamu Mihalj" / "Samu Mihály" Elementary School. The school consists of two buildings. The old one houses the classes from the first to the fourth grade and the new from the fifth to the eighth. The lectures are attended in both Serbian and Hungarian, where both nations have their classes in their respective languages.

Sport
Bačko Petrovo Selo has a football (soccer) and handball teams. Both teams are called "Jedinstvo".

Gallery

Notable individuals
 Vikentije II, Serbian Patriarch

See also
List of places in Serbia
List of cities, towns and villages in Vojvodina

References

Sources
Slobodan Ćurčić, Broj stanovnika Vojvodine, Novi Sad, 1996.

External links
 Divna priroda u Bačkom Petrovom Selu, dobrodosliubecej.blogspot.com 
 History of Bačko Petrovo Selo (aka Péterréve) 

Places in Bačka
Populated places in Vojvodina
South Bačka District
Bečej
Hungarian communities in Serbia